Kildangan GAA is a Gaelic Athletic Association club in Kildangan, County Kildare, Ireland, not to be confused with the similarly named Kildangan GAA, based in County Tipperary. The main activity in the club is Gaelic football.

History
In the Kildangan area, Riverstown Charles J Kickhams affiliated in 1888, with officers James Mooney and Patrick Murray listed as having attended the 1889 convention. Games were played in Riverstown, in a field opposite John "Shirty" Sextons house.
Subsequently, a Gaelic football team was formed in 1913 in Kildangan, playing their first game against Booleigh on Sunday 4 October 1913. This team disbanded in 1915, some of the players transferring to Monasterevin.

After a hiatus of some ten years, Kildangan GAA reformed in 1925 and appeared in the 1925 Junior League Final against Two Mile House. No result of that match has been found. Kildangan had their first success when they won the Junior league in 1930. Their next appearance in a league final was in 1931, where after two replays, they were beaten by Straffan on a scoreline of 1–5 to 0–4. Kildangan made amends by winning the following years competition. Kildangan also had appearances in league finals in 1946 and 1952.

Kildangan played their first Junior championship final in 1936, where they were beaten by Celbridge, who scored 3–6 to Kildangan's 1–2.Kildangan next appeared in a Junior Championship final in 1941, where the team was beaten by Ardclough. 

In 1942, Kildangan beat Cappagh in the final of the Junior Championship, played on 1 Nov in Newbridge. The team was as follows:- John (Shirty) Sexton, George Sexton, Jack Sexton, Eamonn Lawlor, Paddy Behan, Tommy Berns, Michael Ryan, Hal Conway, Jimmy Behan, John Joe Martin, Joseph Conlan, Tommy Behan, John Merrins, Bill Broderick, Michael O'Sullivan and Thomas Curran. Kildangan were a point behind in the last minute when a goal by Midfielder Hal Conway secured victory.

In 1943 Kildangan reached the Intermediate Final, again against Ardclough. The score in the final was Ardclough 2-12 Kildangan 1–3, the game was played in front of a then record attendance of 1658 spectators in Newbridge.

The following years were somewhat barren, and the club ceased to exist in the 1960s, due mainly to high unemployment and an exodus of some of the more gifted players, such as Paddy and Eddie O'Loughlin to Round Towers.

The club was relaunched in 1970, some players from this era were John Casey, Noel Forde, Ollie Hickey, Eamon Foley, Willie Dunne, Paddy White, Pat Kelly and the Lawless brothers Jimmy and Aiden. In 1980 this team were narrowly beaten in the Junior Championship final by Robertstown. Following this final the club once again folded due to a lack of players. However the underage scene remained active and many Kildangan underage players played on a joint Kildangan Nurney team.

Reemergence
The demographics of Kildangan and its hinterland altered considerably at the start of the new millennium, the Celtic Tiger brought a significant increase in population to the area. The club was re-established in 2001, mainly with players from surrounding clubs, many of whom had played with Nurney underage, and also migrants to the area. Success followed rapidly and Kildangan won the Junior league in 2003. The following year again brought success, when Kildangan won the Junior league and sealed a win over Sarsfields in the Junior C final, on a scoreline of 0–14 to 0-10.

The year 2005 saw Kildangan contest the Junior B final against Caragh, where they were beaten narrowly.

In 2008, Kildangan won the Division 5 league title by beating Suncroft in the final on a scoreline of 0–11 to 1–7.

In early 2009, Kildangan GAA moved to a new location, complete with dressing rooms and a clubhouse, named More O'Ferrall Park. The new grounds were officially opened by Leinster Council Chairman at the time, Seamus Howlin, on 21 May 2010.

Kildangan were also given the honour of being Kildare GAA's Club of the Year in November 2010.

In 2015 Kildangan won the Junior B final against Ballymore Eustace on a scoreline of 2–8 to 1–7.

Camogie
Kildangan Camogie club was founded in 1934, adopting the cream and scarlet colours of Kildangan Stud. Games were played in Lennox's field in Richardstown.
 
The committee in the 1920s was as follows:-
Chairperson: Tommy Stynes 
Secretary: Eileen Stynes 
Treasurer: Mary Murphy 
Team trainers: Tommy Stynes and Mick Lyons.

Following a successful number of years the camogie club lapsed in 1939.

Ladies Football
In 2007, a ladies Gaelic football Club, Kildangan Nurney was established with players from Kildangan, Nurney and surrounding areas.

Underage
Kildangan GAA has placed a major emphasis on underage coaching since its re-establishment and the club now has a thriving underage section, with both boys and girls playing at all categories up to Under 21. In 2015 Kildangan amalgamated from under 14 up to under 21 with Ballykelly, under the Abbey Rangers banner.

Players
Full back Jack Sexton represented Kildare at Senior Level in 1936-37 as did goalkeeper John (Shirty) Sexton around this time. Shirty actually played in the Railway Cup for Leinster around 1937, playing against Munster in Portlaoise.

Other Kildangan stalwarts were Paddy and Eddie O'Loughlin, Sean Duffy, Bill Broderick, The Connell brothers Martin and Sean, Mick Maher, who went on to play Inter-County for Westmeath, Joe Conlan and Jimmy Mullaly.

Former association football player Sean Francis also played for Kildangan GAA. Francis, who had played association football for Birmingham City, Cobh Ramblers, Shamrock Rovers and Longford Town, as well as having been assistant manager to Waterford United until May 2008, made his Gaelic football debut as a substitute in the 2005 Junior B Championship Final against Caragh. In 2006, he received the club's 'Footballer of the Year' award.

Honours
1930-Kildare Junior Football League
1932-Kildare Junior Football League
1942-Kildare Junior Football Championship
2003- Kildare Junior C League Championship
2004- Kildare Junior B League Championship
2004- Kildare Junior C Football Championship
2005-Kildare Junior B Football Championship Finalists-Defeated by Caragh
2008- Division 5 Football League Championship
2010- Kildare GAA Club of the Year
2015- Kildare Junior B Football Championship

References

Bibliography
 Kildare GAA: A Centenary History, by Eoghan Corry, CLG Chill Dara, 1984,  hb  pb
 Soaring Sliothar-A Centenary of Kildare Camogie 1904-2004 by Joan O'Flynn, Chill Dara Camogie Board, 2004

External links
Kildangan GAA Website

Gaelic games clubs in County Kildare
Gaelic football clubs in County Kildare